was established in Karatsu, Saga Prefecture, Japan, in 1990. The collection includes twenty works by Aoki Shigeru as well as paintings by Kuroda Seiki, Wada Eisaku, and Yamashita Shintarō. Temporary exhibitions are also mounted. In 2014 the museum became a Public Interest Incorporated Foundation.

See also

 Saga Prefectural Museum
 Karatsu Castle
 List of Cultural Properties of Japan - paintings (Saga)

References

External links
  Kawamura Art Museum

Museums in Saga Prefecture
Karatsu, Saga
Art museums and galleries in Japan
Art museums established in 1990
1990 establishments in Japan